Peter Charles Bayley (25 January 1921 – 3 November 2015) was an English literary critic and academic. He was a fellow at University College, Oxford (1949–1972), the first Principal of Collingwood College, Durham (1972–1978), and Professor of English at the University of St Andrews (1978–1985).

Early life
Bayley was born on 25 January 1921. He was educated at The Crypt School, Gloucester, and University College, Oxford, where he was a Sidwick Exhibitioner (1940–41). He undertook war service during the Second World War (1941–46).

Academic career
He was subsequently a Junior Research Fellow (1947–49), then a Fellow and Praelector in English (1949–72), and Keeper of the College Buildings at University College. He was made an Emeritus Fellow of the college in 1985.

The Times Literary Supplement wrote of his book on Spenser as being "a packed but lucidly written book which will be of permanent value to all students, and indeed readers, of Spenser".
He also edited the University College Record for a number of years.

While a don at Oxford, Bayley oversaw the activities of the Oxford University Dramatic Society (OUDS) and the University College Players. He produced He Who Gets Slapped by Leonid Andreyev for the Univ Players in 1953. He was a Curator of the University Theatre and Chairman of the University Theatre Appeal Committee. Bayley was the tutor of the author V.S. Naipaul.

References

1921 births
2015 deaths
Alumni of University College, Oxford
Fellows of University College, Oxford
English literary critics
English theatre managers and producers
People educated at The Crypt School, Gloucester
English male non-fiction writers
20th-century English businesspeople